Carver's Creek Methodist Church, also known as Carver's Creek United Methodist Church, is a historic Methodist church located near Council, Bladen County, North Carolina.  It was built in 1859, and is a frame Greek Revival-style church with a pedimented front portico, and a two-story rear addition.  It measures 40 feet across and 60 feet deep.

It was added to the National Register of Historic Places in 2008.

References

Methodist churches in North Carolina
Churches on the National Register of Historic Places in North Carolina
Churches completed in 1859
19th-century Methodist church buildings in the United States
Churches in Bladen County, North Carolina
National Register of Historic Places in Bladen County, North Carolina